Llallawa (Aymara for a monstrous potato (like two potatoes) or animal, Quechua for the god of seed-time during the Inca period, Hispanicized spelling Llallahua) is a mountain in the Andes of southern Peru, about  high. It is situated in the Puno Region, El Collao Province, Capazo District, and in the Chucuito Province, Pisacoma District.

References

Mountains of Peru
Mountains of Puno Region